Tarttelin is a surname. Notable people with the surname include:

Abigail Tarttelin (born 1987), English novelist and actress
David Tarttelin (born 1929), English painter, paternal grandfather of Abigail